Veronica Gerbi is an Italian curler.

Teams

Women's

Mixed

References

External links

Living people
Italian female curlers
Year of birth missing (living people)
Place of birth missing (living people)